Atmore is a hamlet in Alberta, Canada within Athabasca County.

Demographics

See also 
List of communities in Alberta
List of designated places in Alberta
List of hamlets in Alberta

References

Athabasca County
Hamlets in Alberta
Designated places in Alberta